The canton of Escalquens is an administrative division of the Haute-Garonne department, southern France. It was created at the French canton reorganisation which came into effect in March 2015. Its seat is in Escalquens.

It consists of the following communes:
 
Aignes
Aigrefeuille
Auragne
Ayguesvives
Baziège
Belberaud
Belbèze-de-Lauragais
Caignac
Calmont
Corronsac
Deyme
Donneville
Escalquens
Espanès
Fourquevaux
Gibel
Issus
Labastide-Beauvoir
Lauzerville
Mauvaisin
Monestrol
Montbrun-Lauragais
Montgeard
Montgiscard
Montlaur
Nailloux
Noueilles
Odars
Pompertuzat
Pouze
Préserville
Sainte-Foy-d'Aigrefeuille
Saint-Léon
Seyre
Varennes

References

Cantons of Haute-Garonne